Novonikolayevka is a rural locality (a village) in Novochebenkinsky Selsoviet, Zianchurinsky District, Bashkortostan, Russia. The population was 227 as of 2010. There is 1 street.

Geography 
Novonikolayevka is located 30 km northwest of Isyangulovo (the district's administrative centre) by road. Nazarovo is the nearest rural locality.

References 

Rural localities in Zianchurinsky District